Hey Mama may refer to:

 Hey Mama (band), an American rock band
 "Hey Mama" (Black Eyed Peas song), 2004
 "Hey Mama" (Kanye West song), 2005
 "Hey Mama" (David Guetta song), 2015
 "Hey Mama!" (song), by Exo-CBX, 2016
 "Hey Mamma", a song by SunStroke Project
 "Hey Mama", a song by Mat Kearney from his 2011 album Young Love
 "Hey Mama", a song by Nathaniel Rateliff & the Night Sweats from their 2018 album Tearing at the Seams
 "Hey Mama", a 1984 song by Righeira

See also 
 Hey Ma (disambiguation)
 "Hey Mami/Play It Right", a 2014 song by Sylvan Esso